It's the Pied Piper, Charlie Brown is the 39th and last animated special produced under the supervision of Charles M. Schulz. Based on characters from the comic strip Peanuts, it was originally released exclusively in VHS and DVD formats on September 12, 2000, seven months after Schulz's death.

Plot
Charlie Brown tells his little sister Sally the story of the Pied Piper of Hamelin. 

The town of Hamelin is infested with mice whose antics disrupt the daily lives of the town citizens. In hopes of solving the problem, the mayor hires the "Pied Piper Beagle" (Snoopy) and promises to pay him with a year's supply of dog food.  Snoopy plays a concertina and lures the mice out of town. When the mayor refuses to pay Snoopy, the "Pied Piper Beagle" uses his instrument to lure the mayor and his assistants out of town as well.

Charlie Brown finishes his story and Sally insists such a thing would not happen in real life. From his doghouse outside, Snoopy begins playing music. Linus, Lucy, Franklin and Peppermint Patty dance to the beat, until Lucy demands Snoopy stop.

Cast
 Quinn Beswick - Charlie Brown
 Ashley Edner - Sally Brown
 Corey Padnos - Linus van Pelt
 Rachel Davey - Lucy van Pelt
 Frank Welker - The Mayor (speaking voice)
 Randy Crenshaw - The Mayor (singing voice)
 Neil Ross - Interviewer/Townsperson/The Mayor's Council (speaking voices)
 Randy Crenshaw, Michael Mishaw, Gene Morford, and Don Shelton - The Mayor's Council (singing voices)
 Pat Musick - First Woman
 Joan Van Ark - Secretary
 Bill Melendez - Snoopy/Woodstock/Mice Sounds

Violet, Peppermint Patty, Schroeder, Pig-Pen, Marcie, and Franklin also appear but have no lines.

References

External links
 

2000 direct-to-video films
Peanuts television specials
Television shows directed by Bill Melendez
2000s American television specials
2000s American animated films
2000 in American television
2000s animated television specials
2000 in animation
Films based on Pied Piper of Hamelin
Animated direct-to-video specials